A talismanic shirt (or talisman shirt;) is a worn textile talisman. Talismanic shirts are found throughout the Muslim world. The shirts can be grouped to four types which differ in style and the symbols used: an Ottoman, a Safavid, a Mughal and a West African one.

The earliest surviving examples were made approximately in 15th century, though the tradition of talismanic shirts might be much older. In Surah Yusuf of the Quran, a shirt of the prophet Joseph is described as giving him protection and even miracle-working. He hands it over so it can heal the blindness of his father Jacob: .

The shirts may be inscribed with verses from Quran, names of Allah and of prophets and with numbers. They may carry images or symbols, e.g. astrological ones. The inscribed names are believed to be capable of offering protection and guidance to the carrier. Although talismanic shirts can be worn to protect against many evils most of them seem to be intended as a shield in battle.

Some examples in collections

 Talismanic shirt, Bursa, Turkey, end of the 14th–beginning of the 15th century, Turkish and Islamic Arts Museum, Istanbul, accession number 539
 Talismanic shirt for Sultan Cem, 1480, Topkapı Palace Museum, Istanbul. It was produced when Cem was still Şehzade. Unusually, the beginning and end of the manufacturing of the object are inscribed.
 Talismanic shirt for Sultan Suleiman the Magnificent, Topkapı Palace Museum, Istanbul. It was commissioned by Suleiman's wife Hürrem Sultan.
 Talismanic shirt, Northern India or Deccan, 15th–early 16th century, Metropolitan Museum of Art, New York, accession number 1998.199
 Talismanic shirt, India, 15th–16th century, Victoria and Albert Museum, London, accession number T.59-1935
The Khalili Collections include four talismanic shirts. The Khalili Collection of Hajj and the Arts of Pilgrimage has shirts from 17th century Turkey (TXT 545) and from 16th or 17th century Mughal India (TXT 471) that depict the holy sites of Mecca and Medina and are inscribed with prayers and extracts from the Quran. The one from Turkey is unusual in having realistic, rather than schematic, depictions of the holy sites. The Khalili Collection of Islamic Art includes shirts from 16th century Turkey (TXT 463) and 18th/19th century India (TXT 574).

See also

References

Further reading

External links 

Talismans
Shirts
Islamic clothing